Andreas Marcus Kaplan (born October 5, 1977) is Professor of Marketing at the ESCP Business School. He is specialized in the areas of social media, viral marketing, and the digital world in general.

Life
Kaplan was born on October 5, 1977, and grew up in Munich, Germany. His mother is Anneliese Kaplan (dressmaker) and his father is Vincenc Kaplan (locksmith).

Professor Kaplan holds a Master of Public Administration from the École nationale d'administration, an M.Sc. from ESCP Business School, and a B.Sc. from the Ludwig Maximilian University of Munich. He completed his Habilitation at the Sorbonne and his Ph.D. at the University of Cologne in cooperation with HEC Paris. Kaplan was visiting Ph.D. at INSEAD and participated in the International Teachers Programme at the Kellogg School of Management, Northwestern University.
Before joining ESCP Business School, Kaplan started his career as marketing professor at the ESSEC Business School and Sciences Po Paris.

Kaplan currently has the Dean's position of ESCP Business School Paris, Sorbonne Alliance.  Previously, he was the Rector of ESCP Berlin, acted as the School's Dean for Academic Affairs/Provost and before as its Director of Brand and Communications. Moreover, Kaplan was elected Head of the Faculty's marketing department.

Kaplan is founding member of the European Center for Digital Competitiveness. He is fellow of the St George's House (Windsor Castle), and member of Kozminski University’s Executive Education Advisory Board.

Particularly interested in the future of management education in Europe and the general business school landscape, Kaplan has furthermore written articles treating European management as well as higher education and their future evolution, notably with the digitization of the sector due to the arrival of MOOCs and SPOCs. Defining Europe as holding “maximum cultural diversity at minimal geographical distances“, Kaplan is a strong advocate of cross-cultural management education. He furthermore is in favor of an EU commissioner for happiness. Kaplan has teaching experience in top-tier schools and universities such as Harvard University, Sciences Po Paris, and Tsinghua University.

Research
Kaplan started doing research in the areas of mass customization, innovation, customer lifetime valuation, and relationship marketing. Since then, his research mainly deals with analyzing and decrypting the digital sphere. With more than 37,000 citations on Google Scholar, Kaplan was counted amongst the Top 50 Business and Management authors in the world according to John Wiley & Sons. In 2020, Andreas Kaplan ranked in a Stanford study of the world's top 2% of scientists. Kaplan received the annual Best Article Award from Business Horizons, sponsored by Elsevier, for his 2012 paper "If you love something, let it go mobile: Mobile marketing and mobile social media 4x4". In particular, his 2010 article co-authored with Michael Haenlein "Users of the world, unite! The challenges and opportunities of social media" published in Business Horizons is widely cited (over 25,000 times on Google Scholar and over 6,000 times in Scopus) and known in the field. This seminal article "Users of the World, Unite!" recurrently achieved first place in Science Direct's annual list of the 25 most downloaded publications across all 24 core subject areas covered in Science Direct, ranging from management to engineering, psychology, or neuroscience and thus was downloaded more often than any other of the approximately 13.4 million papers in the collection.

More recent research deals with the influence of the digital sphere on higher education, such as the arrival of MOOCs and SPOCs, as well as in the area of artificial intelligence. Kaplan is on the editorial board of the Journal of Global Fashion Marketing.

Publications

Papers
 Kaplan Andreas, Haenlein Michael, Schoder Detlef (2006) Valuing the real option of abandoning unprofitable customers when calculating customer lifetime value, Journal of Marketing, 70(3), 5–20
 Kaplan A.M., Haenlein M. (2006) Toward a Parsimonious Definition of Traditional and Electronic Mass Customization, Journal of Product Innovation Management, 23(2), 168–182
 Kaplan Andreas M., Haenlein Michael (2010) Users of the world, unite! The challenges and opportunities of social media, Business Horizons, 53(1), 59–68
 Kaplan A.M., Haenlein M.  (2011) Two hearts in 3/4 time: How to waltz the Social Media – Viral Marketing dance, Business Horizons, 54(3), 253–263
 Kaplan A.M., Haenlein M. (2011) The early bird catches the news: Nine things you should know about micro-blogging, Business Horizons, 54(2), 105–113
 Kaplan Andreas (2011) Social media between the real and the virtual: How Facebook, YouTube & Co. can become an extension of the real life of their users – and sometimes even more, Prospective Strategique, 38 (Mars), 8–13
 Kaplan Andreas M., Haenlein Michael (2012) The Britney Spears universe: Social media and viral marketing at its best, Business Horizons, 55(1), 27–31
 Kaplan Andreas M. (2012) If you love something, let it go mobile: Mobile marketing and mobile social media 4x4, Business Horizons, 55(2), 129–139
 Kaplan Andreas M. (2014) European Management and European Business Schools: Insights from the History of Business Schools, European Management Journal, 32(4), 529-534.

 Pucciarelli F., Kaplan Andreas M. (2016) Competition and Strategy in Higher Education: Managing Complexity and Uncertainty, Business Horizons, Volume 59(3), 311-320.
 Kaplan Andreas M., Haenlein Michael (2016) Higher education and the digital revolution: About MOOCs, SPOCs, social media, and the Cookie Monster, Business Horizons, Volume 59.
 Kaplan Andreas (2018) “A School is a Building that Has 4 Walls - with Tomorrow Inside”: Toward the Reinvention of the Business School, Business Horizons.

Books
 
 
 
Kaplan Andreas (October 2015) European business and management. Sage Publications Ltd., London. 
(Vol. I) – Cultural specificities and cross-cultural commonalities
(Vol. II) – Business ethics and corporate social responsibility
(Vol. III) – Contextual diversity and interdisciplinary aspects
(Vol. IV) – Business education and scholarly research
Kaplan Andreas: Academia Goes Social Media, MOOC, SPOC, SMOC, and SSOC: The digital transformation of Higher Education Institutions and Universities, in Bikramjit Rishi and Subir Bandyopadhyay (eds.), Contemporary Issues in Social Media Marketing, Routledge, 2018 
Tuten T., Solomon M., Kaplan A.M. (2019) Marketing des médias sociaux, Pearson, Paris.

References

External links
 Biography – ESCP Website
 Complete publication list

German business theorists
German educators
Business educators
Living people
Marketing theorists
1977 births
Writers from Munich
École nationale d'administration alumni
ESCP Europe alumni
Ludwig Maximilian University of Munich alumni
University of Cologne alumni
Pantheon-Sorbonne University alumni
HEC Paris alumni
University of Paris alumni
French university and college faculty deans